Vlatko Novakov (born 28 September 1978) is a retired Macedonian football defender.

References

1978 births
Living people
Macedonian footballers
FK Sileks players
FK Vardar players
FK Napredok players
FK Bregalnica Štip players
North Macedonia international footballers
Association football defenders